The Oregon Progressive Party is a political party in the U.S. state of Oregon. Originally called the Oregon Peace Party, it was accepted as the sixth minor statewide political party in Oregon on August 22, 2008.  This allowed the party to nominate Ralph Nader as its candidate in the 2008 U.S. presidential election. In September 2009, the party changed its name to the Oregon Progressive Party, to "more accurately reflects the party's positions" on issues besides peace, including "social justice, consumer advocacy, environmental protection, and worker's rights."

Membership
Following the renaming of the party to the Oregon Progressive Party in September 2009, membership in the Oregon Peace Party ceased to exist by Oregon law. Party leaders encouraged its former members to register with the renamed Oregon Progressive Party. During May 2010 the party had 391 members and in June 2010 the number had grown to 817 members.

Political positions
The progressive party is for economic and environmental justice, and grassroots democracy. They are also proponents of raising the state minimum wage to $18 an hour or more. In 2019, the OPP was part of a statewide coalition that sought to "create a nonpartisan citizens panel to handle redistricting for congressional and legislative seats in Oregon following the 2020 census."

Candidates

2010
The Progressive Party nominated a slate of candidates for the 2010 general election, including one Democrat, Peter DeFazio (a 12-term member of Congress from Oregon's 4th Congressional District). Among the other candidates nominated were former Democratic state senator and 2004 Socialist Party USA presidential candidate Walt Brown, It did not nominate a candidate for Governor.

Presidential ticket

Gubernatorial election results

See also
 Ralph Nader presidential campaign, 2008
 Pacific Green Party, nominated Nader for Oregon ballot in 2000
 Ballot access
 Politics of Oregon

Footnotes

External links
Oregon Progressive Party (official website)

Progressive
Oregon
2007 establishments in Oregon
Progressive parties in the United States
Political parties established in 2007
Political parties in the United States
State and local socialist parties in the United States